Muhammad Junaid Anwar Chaudhry (born 27 June 1967) is a Pakistani politician who has been a member of the National Assembly of Pakistan since August 2018. Previously he was a member of the National Assembly from 2008 to May 2018. He served as Minister of State for Communications in Abbasi cabinet from August 2017 to May 2018.

Early life
He was born on 27 June 1967.

Political career
He was elected to the National Assembly of Pakistan as a candidate of Pakistan Muslim League (N) (PML-N) from Constituency NA-93 (Toba Tek Singh-II) in 2008 Pakistani general election. He received 84,061 votes and defeated Mian Muhammad Kashif Ashfaq, a candidate of Pakistan Muslim League (Q) (PML-Q). 

He was re-elected to the National Assembly as a candidate of PML-N from Constituency NA-93 (Toba Tek Singh-II) in 2013 Pakistani general election. He received 117,534 votes and defeated Chaudhry Muhammad Ashfaq, a candidate of Pakistan Tehreek-e-Insaf.

Following the election of Shahid Khaqan Abbasi as Prime Minister of Pakistan in August 2017, he was inducted into the federal cabinet of Abbasi. He was appointed as the Minister of State for Communications. Upon the dissolution of the National Assembly on the expiration of its term on 31 May 2018, Chaudhry ceased to hold the office as Minister of State for Communications.

He was re-elected to the National Assembly as a candidate of PML-N from Constituency NA-112 (Toba Tek Singh-II) in 2018 Pakistani general election. He received 125,303 votes and defeated Chaudhry Muhammad Ashfaq, a candidate of Pakistan Tehreek-e-Insaf.

He has been appointed as Special Assistant to PM. Junaid would reportedly head Prime Minister’s complaint cell, while his protocol would be equivalent to a minister of state.

References

Living people
Pakistan Muslim League (N) politicians
Punjabi people
Pakistani MNAs 2013–2018
1967 births
Pakistani MNAs 2008–2013
Pakistani MNAs 2018–2023